A tunnel tree is a large tree in whose trunk a tunnel has been drilled. This practice took place mainly at the end of the 19th and beginning of the 20th century in the west of the United States.

The tunnel allowed tourists to walk or drive through the tree with a car. The tunnels were bored to boost tourism.

The tunnelling seriously damaged the health of the trees. As a result, some trees have fallen. Due to the harmful effects of hollowing out trees, the practice of creating tunnel trees has been abandoned.

References

Trees
Tunnels